Harry John Redmond (September 13, 1887 in Cleveland, Ohio – July 10, 1960 in Cleveland, Ohio), was a professional baseball player who played second base for the 1909 Brooklyn Superbas. He holds the record for most career plate appearances without reaching base, at 21.

External links

1887 births
1960 deaths
Major League Baseball second basemen
Brooklyn Superbas players
Baseball players from Cleveland
Vicksburg Hill Billies players
Vicksburg Hill Climbers players
Memphis Egyptians players
Winston-Salem Twins players
Springfield Ponies players
Galveston Sand Crabs players
Edmonton Gray Birds players